Psychic Emperor is a pop-electronic collaboration between Tristan Marcum and the production of Plastiq Phantom.  Their debut self-titled full-length was released December 17, 2004 on imputor? Records.  In December 2006, Psychic Emperor released Communications, a 6-track EP containing live tracks recorded at Los Angeles' KXLU radio station. Psychic Emperor is also known for their indie rock covers of The Misfits Songs, including Angelfuck, Where Eagles Dare, Hybrid Moments, Last Caress and more.

Members
 Tristan Marcum - Vocals, Guitar - See also: Vells
 Darrin Wiener - Beats, Production - See also: Plastiq Phantom
 Jeremiah Green - Drums/Percussion, Guitar, Harp, Sound Effects - See also: Modest Mouse, Vells, Red Stars Theory
 Mary Thinnes - Keyboards - See also: Vells
 James Bertram - Bass - See also: Built to Spill, Red Stars Theory, 764-HERO
 Stuart Fletcher - Bass - See also: The Sorts
 Adam Howry - Bass
 Seth Warren - Violin - See also: Red Stars Theory, FCS North
 Brent Arnold - Cello

Discography
 Psychic Emperor (imputor?, 2004)
 Communication (imputor?, 2006)

External links
 Official Psychic Emperor Website
 imputor? Records' Psychic Emperor Page
 Psychic Emperor @ Last.fm
 [ Allmusic.com: Psychic Emperor]

Musical groups from Washington (state)